Hemidactylus vernayi is a species of house gecko from Angola.

References

External links
 Reptile Database

Endemic fauna of Angola
Hemidactylus
Reptiles described in 2020